Proalbionbaatar is a small mammal from the Upper Jurassic of Guimarota, Portugal. It's the most derived member of the order Multituberculata known from that locality, and shared the world with the much larger dinosaurs. It lies within the suborder "Plagiaulacida" and family Albionbaataridae.

The genus Proalbionbaatar was named by Hahn G. and Hahn R. in 1998, based on a single species. The name refers to it being both earlier and more basal than Albionbaatar, a broadly similar form known from the Lower Cretaceous of Dorset, England.

The species Proalbionbaatar plagiocyrtus was named by Hahn G. and Hahn R. in 1998. Fossil remains are known from the Kimmeridgian (Upper Jurassic)-age strata of Guimarota, Portugal. Remains are presently restricted to two isolated upper molars, which are smaller than the corresponding teeth of paulchoffatiids (Paulchoffatiidae is the best represented multi group from Guimarota). These teeth also have more cusps, which are arranged in two rows. (Hahn & Hahn 2000, p. 106).

References 
 Hahn & Hahn (1998), Neue Beobachtungen an Plagiaulacoidea (Multituberculata) des Ober-Juras 4. Ein Vertreter der Albionbaartaridae im Lusitanien Portugals. Berliner geowissenschaftliche Abhandlungen E 28, p. 85-89.
(New observations of Plagiaulacoidea (Multituberculata) from the Upper Jurassic.  4. A representative of Albiobaataridae in the Lusitanien of Portugals.)
 Hahn G & Hahn R (2000), Multituberculates from the Guimarota mine, p. 97-107 in Martin T & Krebs B (eds), Guimarota - A Jurassic Ecosystem, Verlag Dr Friedrich Pfeil, München.
 Kielan-Jaworowska Z & Hurum JH (2001), "Phylogeny and Systematics of multituberculate mammals". Paleontology 44, p. 389-429.
 With much thanks to David Marjanovic for some information.
 Much of this information has been derived from  MESOZOIC MAMMALS; Plagiaulacidae, Albionbaataridae, Eobaataridae & Arginbaataridae, an Internet directory.

Late Jurassic mammals
Extinct mammals of Europe
Multituberculates
Prehistoric mammal genera